The 6th Space Warning Squadron is located at Cape Cod Space Force Station, in Sagamore, Massachusetts. It operates the PAVE PAWS radar to watch for missiles launched toward North America. The squadron is assigned to Space Delta 4.  The squadron was first organized in October 1979 as the 6th Missile Warning Squadron

Mission
The mission of the 6th SWS is to observe United States coasts for incoming sea–launched or intercontinental ballistic missiles using the PAVE PAWS radar system.  Also, the 6th is to determine the potential threat of the numbers and destination of incoming missiles; then report continuous information to the North American Aerospace Defense Command, Cheyenne Mountain Space Force Station, and NORTHCOM.

History
The 6th Space Warning Squadron was founded at Cape Cod Missile Early Warning Station in August 1977. It was the first squadron in the country to be equipped with PAVE PAWS.

PAVE PAWS also generates information on the location and velocity of earth-orbiting satellites to NORAD.

The squadron also had a detachment at North Truro Air Force Station from 1977 to 1985, when the station closed and operations at the accompanying radar dome were taken over by the Federal Aviation Administration. The 2165th Communications Squadron was a separate tenant at CCAFS until 1986 when it was merged with the 6th SWS.

Lineage
 Constituted as the 6th Missile Warning Squadron
 Activated on 1 October 1979
 Redesignated 6th Space Warning Squadron on 15 May 1992

Assignments
 21st Air Division, 1 October 1979
 Aerospace Defense Command  1 October 1979
 45th Air Division, 1 December 1979
 1st Space Wing, 1 May 1983
 21st Operations Group, 15 May 1992 – present

Stations
Cape Cod Space Force Station, Massachusetts, 1 October 1979 – present

Awards and decorations
Air Force Outstanding Unit Award
1 January 1998 – 31 December 1998
1 October 1997 – 30 September 1999
1 October 1995 – 30 September 1997
2014
 2004 Partridge Slemon Award as North American Aerospace Defense Command's most outstanding unit for its support of the common defense and partnership in protecting the U.S. and Canadian homelands

List of commanders

Col Richard Cable
Col Mario V. Mascola
Col William R. Smith
Lt Col Craig Z. Lowry, 29 June 1995 – ???
Lt Col Paul Hamilton
Lt Col Christopher R. Gentry
Lt Col J. Arnett
Lt Col C. Lowery
Lt Col Nina Armagno, June 2003 – December 2004
Lt Col Paul S. Hamilton, 14 December 2004 – 10 August 2006
Lt Col Max E. Lantz II, June 2008 – June 2010
Lt Col Walt Jackim, ??? – 27 June 2014
Lt Col David Anderson, 27 June 2014 – ???
Lt Col Nathan J. Hippe, ??? – 28 June 2018
Lt Col James E. Roberts, 28 June 2018 – 23 June 2020
Lt Col Timothy “Vax” Sheehan, 23 June 2020 – June 2022
Lt Col Stewart C. Smith, June 2022

References

External links

6th Space Warning Squadron

Squadrons of the United States Space Force
Military units and formations in Massachusetts
Military units and formations established in 1992